Scott Aitchison  (born January 14, 1973) is a Canadian politician who was elected to represent the riding of Parry Sound—Muskoka in the House of Commons of Canada in the 2019 Canadian federal election. Prior to his election, he served as mayor of Huntsville from 2014 until 2019. Aitchison ran in the 2022 leadership election for the Conservative Party of Canada, coming in last with 1% of the vote.

Early career
In his early years, Aitchison worked in sales with Coldwell Banker Thompson Real Estate, and Fowler Construction. He was also previously a consultant with Enterprise Canada Group from 1998-2004.

He was a co-chair of the organizing committee for the 2012 Ontario Para Winter Games in Huntsville.

Municipal politics
Aitchison was first elected to the Huntsville Town Council in 1994 at the age of 21, where he served for three terms. At the time, he was the youngest individual ever elected to Huntsville Town Council and Muskoka District Council. He was elected again as a District and Town Councilor in 2010 and was Deputy Mayor for the next four years. He was elected mayor in 2014 and re-elected in 2018. He served the office until October 28, 2019.

Federal politics
Aitchison won the Conservative nomination in 2019, defeating three other candidates, and subsequently won the general election in October of the same year. After winning re-election in 2021, Aitchison was appointed to the Official Opposition Shadow Cabinet as the Shadow Minister for Labour.

In December 2021, Aitchison worked directly with Liberal Minister Seamus O'Regan to include in Government Bill C-3 an extension of bereavement leave for grieving parents who work in federally regulated industries. This change thereby incorporated a previously tabled private member’s bill from Conservative MP Tom Kmiec into the government’s legislation. O'Regan said that the display of cross-party support was a rarity.

On March 3, 2022, it was reported that Aitchison was preparing a bid for leadership of the Conservative Party of Canada with a campaign focused around character and tone. Aitchison officially launched his campaign on March 20 at a rally in Huntsville. On September 10, it was announced that Pierre Poilievre won the leadership on the first ballot.

Political positions

Political polarization 
During the Canada convoy protest, Aitchison expressed his concern with what he describes as the “growing divide in Canada” and has accused Prime Minister Justin Trudeau of not talking to Canadians he disagrees with. While delivering a speech in the House of Commons, Aitchison stated his desire to see politicians find compromise and “disagree without hating each other.”

Housing 
Aitchison started his leadership campaign by releasing a detailed plan to address what he believes to be a Canadian housing crisis. His plan, "YIMBY: A Plan to Build More Homes for Canadians", has four main aims: ending exclusionary zoning, increasing the number of tradespeople through education and immigration, increasing affordable and social housing, and cracking down on money laundering in Canadian real-estate.

Bill 21 
Aitchison has spoken out against the 2019 Quebec Act respecting the laicity of the State, also known as Bill 21. In his launch speech for the Conservative Party leadership, Aitchison said, "Our Party has a proud tradition of being a voice for freedom of religion around the world. We need to have the courage of our convictions to do the same here at home, in every province and territory. Freedom of religion is a charter right. This includes the right of every single Canadian to proudly wear a cross, hijab, turban or a kippah at their place of work. Bill 21 is wrong, and I will stand against it."

CANZUK 
Aitchison is supportive of CANZUK, a proposed alliance of Canada, Australia, New Zealand, and the United Kingdom to increase trade, foreign policy, and military co-operation. He was named to lead two cross-party working groups aimed to facilitate discussions on freer movement and trade within the partner countries.

Rural broadband 
In his first intervention in the House of Commons, Aitchison raised concern about rural internet service in his riding. He believes there needs to be more competition in the market and federal investment in underserviced areas.

Environment 
Aitchison is an advocate for what he describes as a credible federal climate change plan that would permit industry to find innovative methods of reducing emissions. He is opposed to a carbon tax, stating that it "disproportionally hurts lower-income Canadians living in rural areas".

Electoral record

Federal

Municipal

References

Living people
Conservative Party of Canada MPs
Members of the House of Commons of Canada from Ontario
Mayors of places in Ontario
People from Huntsville, Ontario
1973 births